V trestném území is a 1950 Czechoslovak film. The film starred Josef Kemr.

References

External links
 

1950 films
1950s Czech-language films
Czech crime drama films
Czechoslovak black-and-white films
1950s Czech films
Czech black-and-white films
Czechoslovak crime drama films